Gunbuster, known in Japan as , is a Japanese OVA anime series produced by Bandai, Victor, and Gainax and released from 1988 to 1989. It was the directorial debut of Hideaki Anno, best known as the creator and director of Neon Genesis Evangelion. The title is a combination of the titles of classic tennis manga and anime Aim for the Ace! and hit action drama film Top Gun, whose plot inspired Gunbusters. To celebrate Gainax's 20th anniversary in 2004, a sequel to Gunbuster, Diebuster (or Gunbuster 2), was released as an OVA. The sequel features new characters and mecha, but retains the format and many of the concepts of the original series.

Plot

In the future, a race of insectoid aliens, known as the Uchuu Kaijuu or Space Monsters, seem dedicated to the eradication of humans as the latter takes its first steps away from the Solar System, and they are getting closer and closer to Earth. Humanity has responded by developing space-going battleships and giant fighting robots. These complex robots—RX-7 Machine Weapons—are actually an advanced type of fighting suit, piloted by a single occupant. As advanced as they are, however, they are being used as trainers for a new weapon, the Gunbuster. Pilot candidates are selected from the best and brightest youth on Earth and the Lunar colony. These are trained at schools around the world.

In the year 2023, six years after the first battles with the aliens (the actual battle started in the year 2015 however due to time dilation, two years went by on Earth by the end of the battle), and centers on young Noriko Takaya (タカヤ・ノリコ Takaya Noriko) (voice: Noriko Hidaka). Although Noriko's father was a famous admiral in the space fleet who went missing following one of the first battles of the war, her own talents as a pilot are questionable—especially when compared to the other students. Nonetheless, she has entered a training school on Okinawa, where she is largely influenced by her instructor, Kōichirō Ōta ("Coach Ōta") (voice: Norio Wakamoto), who was one of Admiral Takaya's crew. He has faith that she will overcome her early clumsiness, while other students are critical of her inability, referring to Noriko as the "daughter of defeat".

Noriko idolizes the beautiful, competent and talented Kazumi Amano (アマノ・カズミ Amano Kazumi) (voice: Rei Sakuma). Amano is the top RX-7 pilot at the school, and likely the entire world. Coach Ōta shows the extra training which Amano creates for herself, inspiring Noriko to look within herself for strengths which she did not know that she had.

Only two Gunbuster pilots from each school will be selected for the real mission. Amano, of course, will be going, and all of the others want the second slot on the team. Takaya is determined to win, not only to be with Amano but also to find (or avenge) her father. She is thrilled to discover that she has in fact been chosen as the second Japanese pilot.

Following that selection, conflict between Takaya and other students comes to a head, when the second-best RX-7 pilot at the school publicly challenges her to a one-on-one fight. Planned for late at night, when none of the school authorities will be around to stop it, Ōta learns of the duel and comes to the battleground—but does nothing. He is there to observe, and perhaps to save Takaya's life, if the combat gets too intensive.

Takaya is on the defensive from the start, and the older student humiliates her by action and over the radio. As Takaya's RX-7 is pummeled, Noriko realizes that her difficulties are a case of sensory overload—she is getting too much information from the electronic monitoring systems. She turns off her monitors, but as the systems go dark, her opponent is infuriated by the perceived insult and prepares the final, killing blow. Just as it appears that Noriko is doomed, she destroys her opponent's RX-7 with a "Thunder Kick". Her opponent muses that the school rookie has beat her with an advanced maneuver which she hadn't been taught. This is the proof that Ōta was seeking, that Noriko had an innate ability which would be invaluable in the battles to come.

Together, with Coach Ōta and Amano, Takaya is sent into space to train with other representatives from all over the solar system in preparation for the attack upon the space monsters. There they are introduced to a Soviet pilot from the moon base by the name of Jung Freud (voice: Maria Kawamura). On their first training mission, Takaya and Amano are stopped by Jung, and challenged to a duel. Amano and Jung become completely involved in the fight, as Noriko trails along, and all three get lost within the machinery of the space station. The fight stops midway, when all three come in contact with the first space monster that was defeated and captured.

Once they return they are scolded by their coach, but because of their importance to the missions success as well as building feelings between the coach and them, they are let go with a simple warning. Jung later apologizes for her challenge, and thus begins a friendship with the two.

As they move farther into space, the young pilots are placed in their quarters for subspace traveling. On a dare, Takaya is sent into the hangars and meets a male space pilot named Toren Smith (voice: Kazuki Yao). Amano comes into doubt of Takaya's abilities and asks the Coach to end their partnership. Takaya overhears the conversation and ends up partnering with Smith instead.

The first true battle between the aliens begin, and the humans realize how vastly outmaneuvered and outnumbered they are. They are able to retreat with limited casualties, but Takaya has lost Smith, and gained an uncontrollable fear towards deep space combat. As their second battle approaches, Takaya is determined to improve and asks the Coach for private lessons. Jung finds out and thinking that she doing so to control Gunbuster, challenges her in space. But even before they are able to fight, Takaya breaks down within her suit and is taken to the infirmary.

The captain decides to retreat to Earth, but the fleet is attacked in sub-space, leading to the destruction of the majority of their forces. Once they reach Earth's orbit, only the Exelion and a few minor cruisers are still active. Though their struggle appears bleak, Takaya manages to summon up her strength for the sake of her friends and crew members. She takes control of the incomplete Gunbuster and uses its high-powered weaponry to force the enemy to retreat. The battle is over, but those who remain are faced with the harsh reality of war and its aftermath.

Afterwards, the three pilots return to Earth, where things have changed significantly. Due to the effects of time dilation, 10 years of relative time has passed on Earth while the pilots were in space. Takaya's former nemesis who had previously challenged her at school is now the coach for new pilots. Her best friend, Kimiko, is now a mother with a 3-year-old daughter, and Earth has been working on a 70 km long space ship as a form of defense in the event of a space monster attack.

While in a peaceful lull, Takaya and friends try to re-adjust to living in a world that has already passed them by. Takaya tries to reconnect with her friend, while Amano tries to share her feelings with the Coach. The peace is broken, however, when Earth is notified that a space monster fleet of unprecedented size is headed towards Earth. After many arguments, the idea of sending the old Exelion as an unmanned black hole bomb, is proposed. The Gunbuster is nominated to escort the bomb there, and then to come home.

Takaya and Amano, in separate ships which combine into Gunbuster, are sent out, a trip that will last an hour or more to them, but half a year to everyone back on Earth. As they almost reach their goal, Amano breaks down, admitting that she does not want go forward, since each second forward means the longer she is away from their Coach, who is now dying from space radiation. Takaya is able to convince her to continue, and their mission is a success. Upon returning, they are relieved to learn that the Coach is still alive; he and Amano then get married.

The final episode takes place 15 years later. Amano has lived on Earth during this time, but after the Coach passes away, she decides to take on a final mission. The space monsters have resurfaced, and in retaliation Earth has been building a much larger black hole bomb, which has been created using the mass of Jupiter pressured into the size of the moon.  Known as Buster Machine III, this weapon is the size of a small planet. When detonated, the bomb and 3,000 'slave mines' placed around the center of the galaxy, will cause a black hole to be formed thereby sucking in and destroying the space monsters.

Amano is sent back into space to board the new ship Eltreum, where mobile suits called Sizzlers (buster sized machines, piloted individually) are now used in combat. With the crew present to welcome Amano, she and Takaya share an emotional reunion, though the absence has felt much longer for the former. Takaya has difficulty coming to terms with the fact that so much time has passed on Earth, after only 6 months relative to her.

When the final battle begins, Amano is ordered to man the Gunbuster with Takaya, and both fight alongside others to defend the bomb. The alien army is fended off, allowing the black hole bomb to be set. However, when the time comes to activate, they find out the enemies' attacks have damaged 2% of the 'slave generators' required for implosion. Amano and Takaya decide to dive down into the core of Buster Machine III and activate it by using one of Gunbuster's two Degeneracy reactors, even though doing so means they will likely be unable to leave without suffering severe relativistic time dilation during their escape.

After the bomb is set off, Noriko and Kazumi spend 12,000 Earth years objective traveling home, although for them only hours or days have passed. Upon arriving in Earth orbit in the damaged Gunbuster, the pilots cannot make contact with anyone nor see any sign of habitation on the planet, suggesting that human civilization is long gone. However, their despair is instantly dispelled when a massive light pattern suddenly appears on the planet saying "WELCOME HOMƎ!" spelled out in simplified Japanese ("オカエリナサイ". The final letter "イ", however, is reversed, which indicates the current civilization was mimicking the bygone language). Delighted that their planet is alive and well, the pilots bid the Gunbuster farewell and return to Earth.

Characters

Releases
The series was originally released in Japan over three volumes on VHS videocassette, with two episodes per volume. It was then released on three laserdiscs with a later boxset containing two new science episodes. Eventually, it was released on DVD in 2001. A remastered four disc set was released in 2004 with dramatically improved image, and new extras such as three short animations, a rough cut of episode five and an unmatted version of episode 6.

The series was first released in English in North America starting in March 1990 on video by U.S. Renditions as their first release. It was only released in the original Japanese language audio track and featured some rather loose English subtitles, especially on the first volume. It was later re-released verbatim in 1996 on VHS by Manga Entertainment after U.S. Renditions ceased operations.

The series was released in English on a single DVD in the United Kingdom by Kiseki Films, but this release suffered from poor video quality and inconsistent subtitles. It was also criticized for lack of advertised extras and the editing of a scene with full-frontal nudity.

On November 24, 2006, Bandai Visual USA released a limited, regionless reprint of the 2004 R2 remastered set exclusively at Kinokuniya Bookstores. The set lacked any translation and was an exact 1:1 copy of the R2. The set was marketed to die-hard fans of the show, and was meant to cease distribution upon the R1 release. As of August 2007, six months after officially going off sale, the set could still be purchased at Kinokuniya.

On February 20, 2007, Bandai Visual USA officially released the remastered R1 DVD box set under their Honneamise label, with the series spanned over three discs like the R2 and R0. However, the set lacked the fourth disc of the previous R0, which contained the rough episode five and unmatted episode six, along with other period extras.

While it is common for anime released in North America to come with an English-dubbed audio track, no English-language audio track has been released. In an interview with Anime on DVD, Jonathan Clements stated that "the Music & Effects track has been lost, and [an English dub] would need to be reconstructed from the ground up". However, in 2006, a theatrical version of Gunbuster was released in Japan featuring a 5.1 soundtrack, containing new sound effects, the original score and re-recorded dialogue by the original Japanese voice actors. The feature-length film is an abridged version of the original OVA, and uses the same animated footage as the original. This film (along with the theatrical version of Diebuster, which was released theatrically as a double feature with the Gunbuster theatrical edition) has been licensed for North American distribution by Bandai Visual USA. It was initially released in the USA on DVD as Gunbuster vs. Diebuster: Aim for the Top! The GATTAI!! Movie, a box set containing the theatrical edits of both Gunbuster and Diebuster. A high-definition Blu-ray Disc version was released in November by Bandai Entertainment in the USA (following the liquidation of Bandai Visual USA and Bandai Entertainment's acquisition of the Honneamise label) and by Beez Entertainment in the United Kingdom, where Gunbuster: The Movie will also be released as a separate Blu-ray Disc. Maiden Japan has licensed the Gunbuster film and was released on Blu-ray and DVD on May 17, 2016. On August 7, 2021, it was announced at Otakon that Discotek Media will release the series on Blu-ray with a dub produced by Sound Cadence Studios, marking the first time Gunbuster will be dubbed in English. The Blu-Ray will release on April 25, 2023.

In 2011, Bandai Visual announced a Blu-ray release of the OVA with extras. The Blu-ray set was released on February 24, 2012, in regular and complete limited edition sets. Both sets feature the newly re-recorded 5.1 audio (that was used for the film), along with the original 2.0 mix, remastered video, a brand new short, audio commentary, video shorts, and a 16-page booklet. The complete edition also included a bonus disc, full of production materials, never before seen video footage and a 100-page booklet.

Merchandise
In the mid-1990s, Kaiyodo, in association with Xebec, released a PVC figure of Gunbuster. Though limited in posability, the figure featured an extra set of arms and hands, as well as the weapons Buster Tomahawk and Buster Home Run from the radio dramas. In 2005, Kaiyodo released a newer figure sculpted by Katsuhisa Yamaguchi (of Revoltech fame). Though shorter than the original, this newer figure was more detailed and poseable than its predecessor. A newer version of Gunbuster was released in the Revoltech line as Figure #101 in 2011. Once again sculpted by Yamaguchi, it is capable of transforming into both Buster Machines, and has parts to replicate tearing out the power generator core.

On February 3, 2005, Bandai released Toppo Nerae! Gunbuster for the PlayStation 2 console. It was developed by Shade. It expanded the series with a game that played out as an entirely new third edition that expanded on the themes of the original two animated series. The 25-episode story featured both roaming adventure scenes where defense pilot Noriko Takaya converses with characters and collects items to develop the story, as well as action scenes that put you and co-pilot Kazumi Amano into the cockpit of a Gunbuster mech to battle in heated combat. The action parts allow you to perform all the trademark moves like the Buster Beam, Homing Laser and Super Lighting Kick, with Noriko shouting out the commands with just as much enthusiasm as she does in the show.

In 2006, Bandai released a large diecast toy replica of Gunbuster under the Soul of Chogokin line. Just like in episode 5 of the series, the toy is a combination of Buster Machines 1 and 2. It includes an array of weapons that were used in both the anime and radio drama, as well as a miniature of Kazumi's RX-7 Machine Weapon and a display stand designed to resemble a launch pad. Also included are accessories that can be used to replicate the final scene in episode 6, where Gunbuster removes its power generator core from its chest. In 2013, Bandai released a smaller, more affordable Gunbuster figure under the Super Robot Chogokin line. Despite lacking the transformation feature of the Soul of Chogokin toy, this figure features extreme poseability and comes with two Buster Home Runs and parts for the Double Buster Collider, as well as the power generator core parts. A Tamashii Web exclusive , set for release in July 2013, will include the Buster Shield, Buster Missile arms, two Buster Tomahawks and effects parts for the Buster Colliders and Super Inazuma Kick.

Studio HalfEye also released a transformable replica of Gunbuster. In contrast to Bandai's diecast toy, this figure is made of resin plastic and priced higher.

Figures of Noriko have also been manufactured as well. Yellow Submarine (a division of Takara) released a poseable doll, while Kotobukiya and Kaiyodo sold non-poseable figures. Bandai had a limited-edition Noriko & Nono figure set bundled with the North America and Japan DVD release of Gunbuster vs. Diebuster Aim For The Top! The GATTAI!! Movie.

Cybernetic Hi-School, the third installment of Gainax's eroge strip-quiz video game series for the PC-9801 and MSX, focused on characters from Gunbuster.

See also

Notes

References

External links
 
 
 
 Ain't It Cool News review
 "TOP O NERAE"—The Encyclopedia of Science Fiction

1988 anime OVAs
2006 anime films
Anime OVAs
Bandai Visual
Discotek Media
Films set in 2023
Gainax
Maiden Japan
Seinen manga
Super robot anime and manga
Anime with original screenplays